Jorge Traverso (born 18 October 1947) is an Argentine former footballer.

References

External links
 Jorge Ubaldo Traverso - BDFA

1947 births
Living people
Association football goalkeepers
Argentine footballers
Chacarita Juniors footballers